Kannur University is a multi-campus public university established in 1996 to provide development of higher education in Kasaragod, Kannur, Wayanad districts of Kerala, India. It serves the region of North Malabar. It was established after the passing of Act No. 22 of 1996 of the Kerala Legislative Assembly. A university by the name of "Malabar University" had come into existence even earlier by the passing of an ordinance by the Governor of Kerala, on 9 November 1995.

The university was inaugurated on 2 March 1996 by E. K. Nayanar, then Chief Minister of Kerala. The objective of the Kannur University Act, 1996 was to establish in the state of Kerala a teaching, residential and affiliating university to provide for the development of higher education in Kasaragod and Kannur revenue Districts and the Mananthavady Taluk of Wayanad District.

Kannur University is a multi-campus university, at Kannur, Kasaragod, Mananthavady, Payyannur, Mangattuparamba, Thalassery, Nileshwaram and Manjeshwaram.

Schools and Departments
Thalassery Campus (Dr. Janaki ammal campas), Palayad, Kerala, India
 School of English & Foreign Languages,
 Department of Studies in English
 School of Social Sciences,
 Department of Anthropology
 School of Legal Studies,
 Department of Law
 School of Life Sciences
 Department of Biotechnology & Microbiology
 School of Commerce and Management Studies,
 Department of Management Studies
 School of Development Studies,
 Department of Applied Economics
 I.T. Education Centre

Mangattuparamba Campus, Mangattuparamba, Kerala, India
 Centre for Management Studies-MBA Campus
 Department of Environmental Science
 Department of Mass Communication & Journalism
 School of Information Science & Technology,
 Department of Information Technology
 School of Physical Education and Sports Sciences,
 Department of Physical Education
 School of Pedagogical Sciences
 Department of Teacher Education
 Department of Mathematical Sciences
 Department of Statistical Sciences
 School of Historical & Cultural Studies,
 Department of History & Heritage Studies
 School of Behavioral Sciences
 School of Wood Science & Technology

Kannur Campus, Kerala, India
 School of Distance Education
 Department of Library and Information Science.

Payyanur Campus (Swami Anandatheertha Campus), Payyanur, Kerala, India
 School of Pure and Applied Physics,
 Department of Physics
 School of Chemical Sciences,
 Department of Chemistry
 Department of Geography
 School of Visual and Fine Arts,
 Department of Music

Nileshwaram Campus (Dr. P.K. Rajan Memorial Campus), Kasaragod, Kerala, India
 Department of Molecular Biology
 Department of Malayalam
 Department of Hindi
 I.T. Education Centre
 M.B.A. Centre

Kasaragod Campus, Kasaragod, Kerala, India
 School of Indian Languages,
 Department of Kannada
 I.T. Education Centre
 Centre for Management Studies

Mananthavady Campus, Wayanad, Kerala, India
 Department of Zoology
 Department of Rural & Tribal Sociology

Manjeshwaram Campus, Manjeshwaram, Kerala, India

Inter University Centers 
 Inter University Center for Bioscience, Thalassery campus, Palayad, Kerala, India

Affiliated Colleges

Government Colleges
 Government College, Elerithattu
 Government College Kasaragod
 Government College Mananthavady
 Government Brennen College, Thalassery
 Government College, Chokli
 Government Arts and Science College Peringome
 Govinda Pai College, Manjeshwar
 Krishna Menon Memorial Government Women's College
 Government Arts and Science College, Kinanoor Karindalam

Training Colleges
 Govt. College of Teacher Education, Thalassery

Arts and Science Colleges (Aided)
Beja Model College of Arts and Science (BeMCAS)(Aided), Nettanige, Kasaragod
 Co-operative Arts & Science College, Madayi
 Mahathma Gandhi College, Iritty
 Mary Matha Arts & Science College
 N.A.M. College, Kallikkandy
 Nehru College, Kanhangad
 Nirmalagiri college, Kuthuparamba
 Payyannur College, Payyannur.
 Pazhassi Raja N. S. S. College, Mattanur
 St. Pius X College, Rajapuram
 Sir Syed College (Taliparamba)
 S.E.S. College, Sreekandapuram
 S. N. College, Kannur

Training Colleges (Aided)
 P.K.M. College of Education 
 Keyi Sahib Training College

Oriental Title Colleges (Aided)
 Nusrathul Islam Arabic College
 Darul Irshad Arabic College

Unaided Colleges
 CK Nair Arts And Management College, Kanhangad, Kerala
 MarThoma College for the Hearing Impaired, Cherkala
 Morazha Co-Op Arts & Science College, Morazha
 AMSTECK Arts & Science College, kalliasseri
 College of Applied Science, Pattuvam
 College of Applied Science, Pettikundu
 College of Applied Science, Kuthuparamba
 Malabar Islamic Complex Arts & Science College
 Gurudev Arts & Science College
 Aditya Kiran College of Applied Studies
 Sir Syed Institute of Technical Studies
 Taliparamba Arts & Science College
 Deva Matha Arts & Science College
 Mary Matha Arts & Science College
 Sharaf Arts & Science College
 Bhaskara College of Arts
 Sa-A-Diya Arts & Science College
 SNDP Yogam Arts & Science College
 Dr. Ambedkar Arts & Science College, Sreesailam
 Sree Narayana College of Management Studies
 Mahatma Gandhi Arts & Science College, Chendayad
 I.T.M College of Arts & Science
 Nalanda College of Arts & Science
 Chinmaya Arts & Science College for Women
 MM Knowledge Arts and Science College, Karakund
 Peoples Co-Operative arts & Science College
 Khansa Women's College for advanced Studies
 St. Joseph's College, Pilathara
 M. E. S. College
 Sibga Arts & Science College
 pilathara co-operative college, pilathara
 Our College of Applied Sciences
 Wadihuda Institute of Research and Advanced Studies
WMO Imam Gazzali Arts Science College CH Village, Kappumchal, Panamaram, Wayanad
St.Mary's Arts and Science College, Cherupanathady
Nest institute of humanities and basic science

Oriental Title Colleges (un-aided)
 Ideal Arabic College
 Al-Maqar Arabic College

Professional Colleges (Un-Aided)
 A. W. H Al Badar Special College
 Chinmaya Institute of Technology Chala, Kannur
 College of Engineering & Technology, Payyanur, Kaithapram, Mathamangalam P.O., Kannur 670 307
 Don Bosco Arts & Science College Kannur
 Institute of Technology, Mayyil Kannur
 Malik Deenar Institute of Management Studies, Seethangoli,
 Mar Thoma College of Special Education
 People Institute of Management Studies, Munnad, Kasaragod 671541

Notable alumni
 Adv. A. N. Shamseer, 24th Speaker of Kerala Legislative Assembly
 K. V. Sumesh, Member of Kerala Legislative Assembly
 P. K. Jayalakshmi, Former Minister Government of Kerala
 Manju Warrier, Indian film Actress.
 C. K. Vineeth, Indian Footballer.
 Sayanora Philip, Playback singer
 M. Vijin, MLA
 Sahal Abdul Samad, Indian Professional Football player
 Ganapathi S Poduval, Malayalam Film Actor
 Nikhila Vimal, Malayalam film actress
 Sanusha, Malayalam film actress

Image gallery

References

External links

 Kannur University homepage

1996 establishments in Kerala
Dharmashala, Kannur
Education in Kannur
Educational institutions established in 1996
 
Universities and colleges in Kannur district
Universities in Kerala